Carey Wilson may refer to:

 Carey Wilson (writer) (1889–1962), American screenwriter, voice actor, and producer
 Carey Wilson (ice hockey) (born 1962), Canadian ice hockey centre